Vladimir Lysenin (born 24 January 1978) is a Russian skier. He competed in the Nordic combined events at the 1998 Winter Olympics and the 2002 Winter Olympics.

References

External links
 

1978 births
Living people
Russian male Nordic combined skiers
Olympic Nordic combined skiers of Russia
Nordic combined skiers at the 1998 Winter Olympics
Nordic combined skiers at the 2002 Winter Olympics
Skiers from Moscow